Easy Listening 4 Armageddon is the debut studio album by American hip hop musician Mike Ladd. It was released on Scratchie Records in 1997.

Critical reception

Dan LeRoy of AllMusic gave the album 4 out of 5 stars, commented that "through a series of lo-fi beats and loops that make stunning use of a few choice samples, Ladd creates an eerie soundscape that perfectly matches his muttered musings." Tony Green of JazzTimes wrote, "Ignoring the all too common impulse to pile texture on top of texture, Ladd constructs 12 tracks that cajole as effectively as his richly imagistic poetry."

Greg Kot of Chicago Tribune called it "one of the most accomplished hip-hop debuts in recent years."

Track listing

Personnel
Credits adapted from liner notes.

 Mike Ladd – vocals, production, arrangement, programming, synthesizer (8), mixing (9), art direction, front photography
 Bruce Grant – tape loop
 Vassos – recording (1-7, 9-12), engineering (1-7, 9-12), mixing (10)
 Dawn Norfleet – flute (2)
 Dennis Kelley – synthesizer (3, 8, 10), co-production (2, 3, 4, 6, 7, 11), mixing (1-8, 11, 12)
 Jeff Cordero – guitar (3), recording (1-7, 9-12), engineering (1-7, 9-12), mixing (1-8, 11, 12)
 Bill Green – bass guitar (8, 10)
 John Hancock – recording (8)
 Mio – piano (10)
 Mums the Schemer – vocals (12)
 Shariff Simmons – vocals (12)
 GRFX – vocals (12)
 Natasha Latasha Diggs – vocals (12)
 High Priest – vocals (12)
 Beans – vocals (12)
 Jessica Care Moore – vocals (12)
 Chris Athens – mastering
 J. Stewart – art direction, design
 Dems – bomb logo
 Bill Harris – front photography
 Maceo Bishop – back photography

References

External links
 

1997 debut albums
Mike Ladd albums